Truntaishevo (Torıntayeş; , Torontayış) is a rural locality (a selo) in and the administrative center of Truntaishevsky Selsoviet, Alsheyevsky District, Bashkortostan, Russia. The population was 1,034 as of 2010. There are 16 streets.

Geography 
Truntaishevo is located 23 km northwest of Rayevsky (the district's administrative centre) by road. Ustyevka is the nearest rural locality.

References 

Rural localities in Alsheyevsky District